Knighton Fjord is a fjord in King Christian IX Land, Eastern Greenland. Administratively, Knighton Fjord and its surroundings belong to the Sermersooq municipality.

See also
List of fjords of Greenland

References 

Fjords of Greenland
Sermersooq